David Scott (15 July 1874 – 19 April 1959) was a Scottish gymnast. He competed in the men's team all-around event at the 1908 Summer Olympics.

References

External links
 

1874 births
1959 deaths
British male artistic gymnasts
Olympic gymnasts of Great Britain
Gymnasts at the 1908 Summer Olympics
Sportspeople from Edinburgh